Muaythai was featured in the World Games official programme for the first time at the 2017 World Games in Wrocław, Poland. It has been played at all editions since then. Muaythai was added to the World Games following the decision of the IWGA Annual General Meeting in May 2013. 

The International Federation of Muaythai Associations is governing body for muaythai at the World Games.

Summary

Events
The muaythai competition is organized as a set of tournaments, one for each weight class.  The number of weight classes has changed over the years (currently 6 for men and 6 for women), and the definition of each class has changed several times, as shown in the following table. Weights were measured in kilograms. 

From the 2022 World Games, muaythai events achieved full gender equality.

Medal table

The numbers below are after the 2017 World Games in Wrocław, Poland.

Number of Muay Thai practitioners by nation
The number in each box represents the number of Muay Thai practitioners the nation sent.

Notes

References

 
Sports at the World Games
World Games